The steradian (symbol: sr) or square radian is the unit of solid angle in the International System of Units (SI). It is used in three-dimensional geometry, and is analogous to the radian, which quantifies planar angles. Whereas an angle in radians, projected onto a circle, gives a length on the circumference, a solid angle in steradians, projected onto a sphere, gives an area on the surface. The name is derived from the Greek   'solid' + radian.

The steradian, like the radian, is a dimensionless unit, the quotient of the area subtended and the square of its distance from the centre. Both the numerator and denominator of this ratio have dimension length squared (i.e. , dimensionless). It is useful, however, to distinguish between dimensionless quantities of a different nature, so the symbol "sr" is used to indicate a solid angle. For example, radiant intensity can be measured in watts per steradian (W⋅sr−1). The steradian was formerly an SI supplementary unit, but this category was abolished in 1995 and the steradian is now considered an SI derived unit.

Definition 

A steradian can be defined as the solid angle subtended at the centre of a unit sphere by a circular unit area on its surface. For a general sphere of radius , any portion of its surface with area  subtends one steradian at its centre.

The solid angle is related to the area it cuts out of a sphere:

where
 is the solid angle
 is the surface area of the spherical cap,
 is the radius of the sphere,
 is the height of the cap, and
sr is the unit, steradian.

Other properties 

If , it corresponds to the area of a spherical cap (where  stands for the "height" of the cap) and the relationship  holds. Therefore, in this case, one steradian corresponds to the plane (i.e. radian) angle of the cross-section of a simple cone subtending the plane angle , with  given by:

This angle corresponds to the plane aperture angle of  ≈ 1.144 rad or 65.54°.

The solid angle of a cone whose cross-section subtends the angle  is:

SI multiples 
Millisteradians (msr) and microsteradians (μsr) are occasionally used to describe light and particle beams. Other multiples are rarely used.

See also 
 n-sphere
 Spat (angular unit)
 IAU designated constellations by area

References

External links

Natural units
SI derived units
Units of solid angle